General-purpose may refer to:

 General-purpose technology
 General-purpose alternating current, AC electric power supply
 General-purpose autonomous robots
 General-purpose heat source

Law and government
 General-purpose administrative subdivision
 General-purpose criterion, in international law
 General-purpose district

Military
 A popular false etymology for the Willys MB "Jeep"
 General-purpose bomb
 General-purpose machine gun
 General-purpose mask, M50 Joint-Service
 General-purpose vessel, Explorer class in the Royal Australian Navy

Computing
 General-purpose computer
 General-purpose DBMS
 General-Purpose Graphics Processing Unit (GPGPU)
 General-purpose input/output (GPIO)
 General-purpose macro processor
 General-purpose markup language
 General-purpose modeling
 General-purpose operating system
 General-purpose macro processor or general-purpose preprocessor
 General-purpose programming language
 General-purpose register
 General-Purpose Serial Interface (GPSI)

See also

 
 General (disambiguation)
 Purpose (disambiguation)
 Jeep (disambiguation)
 GP (disambiguation)